CRO, Cro, or CrO may refer to:

Arts and entertainment
 Cro (musician) (born 1990), German rapper and singer
 Cro (TV series), a 1993 American children's animated series

Occupations
 Certified Radio Operator (United States)
 Chief reputation officer
 Chief research officer
 Chief restructuring officer
 Chief revenue officer
 Chief risk officer
 Combat Rescue Officer, in the United States Air Force

Businesses and organizations
 Cave Rescue Organisation, England
 Český Rozhlas, a Czech public radio broadcaster (station designator prefix ČRo)
 Civilian Repair Organisation, a British World War II aircraft repair scheme  
 Commonwealth Relations Office, UK, 1947-1966
 Companies Registration Office (Ireland)
 Contract research organization, a company that provides support to the pharmaceutical, biotechnology, and medical device industries
 Crown Airways (ICAO code CRO)
 Conversion rate optimization, (Marketing Term)
 Companies Registration Office (disambiguation)

Science and technology
 Cathode-ray oscilloscope
 Chromate and dichromate
 Chromium(II) oxide, with chromium in the +2 oxidation state
 Contract Research Organization or Clinical Research Organization, for pharmaceuticals
 cro, a Lambda phage repressor protein

Law
 Civil restraint order, against vexatious litigation, UK
 Cro in early Scots law (see Leges inter Brettos et Scottos)

Other uses
 Croatia (IOC and FIFA country code CRO)
 Conversion rate optimization, in internet marketing
 Credit Repair Organization, see Credit Repair Organizations Act

See also
 Crow (disambiguation)